Bulinus wrighti is a species of small tropical air-breathing freshwater snail with a sinistral shell, an aquatic pulmonate gastropod mollusk in the family Planorbidae, the ramshorn snails and their allies.

Distribution
The type locality is Wadi Hatib, at about 1280 m,southeast of Nisab District, Upper Aulaqui District at Rassais, South Yemen.

References

Bulinus
Gastropods described in 1965